Roupeiro is a white Portuguese wine grape planted primarily in the Alentejo and Douro regions. In Alentejo, the grape is known as Alva. In the Douro, it is known as Codega.

See also
List of Portuguese wine grape varieties

References

White wine grape varieties
Portuguese wine